Forza Nazzjonali (Maltese for "National Force") was an electoral alliance in Malta. The alliance was formed in April 2017 between the Nationalist Party (PN) and Democratic Party (PD) in the run up to the 2017 general election, with PD candidates running under the PN electoral list.

The alliance between PN and PD was officially dissolved in December 2017.

2017 general election results

References

Defunct political parties in Malta
Political parties established in 2017
2017 establishments in Malta
Political parties disestablished in 2017
2017 disestablishments in Malta
Defunct political party alliances in Europe